Trichuris, often referred to as whipworms (which typically refers to T. trichiura only in medicine, and to any other species in veterinary medicine), is a genus of parasitic worms from the roundworm family Trichuridae, which are helminths. The name whipworm refers to the shape of the worm; they look like whips with wider "handles" at the posterior end. The name Trichocephalus is sometimes used for this genus.

Species
The genus Trichuris includes over 20 species, which infect the large intestine of their host, including:
 Trichuris trichiura (sometimes Trichocephalus trichiurus) – causes trichuriasis in humans
 Trichuris campanula (cat whipworm)
 Trichuris serrata (cat whipworm)
 Trichuris suis (pig whipworm)
 Trichuris muris (mouse whipworm)
 Trichuris vulpis (dog whipworm)

A new species – as yet unnamed – has been identified in François’ leaf monkey (Trachypithecus francoisi).

Other species in this genus include Trichuris cynocephalus, Trichuris discolor, Trichuris laevitestis, Trichuris pardinasi, Trichuris navonae, Trichuris ovis, Trichuris rhinopithecus, Trichuris thrichomysi, and Trichuris travassosi.

Trichurias is a soil-transmitted helminthiasis and belongs to the group of neglected tropical diseases, affecting about 604 million people globally.

Researchers are currently facing difficulties completely differentiating the numerous species under the genus Trichuris. When different whipworm species were discovered, the main factor used to differentiate species was the length of the spicule sheath. However, many species were eventually discovered to have similar spicule sheath lengths. Therefore, researchers began to compare other morphologies, such as the structure or orientation surrounding female sex organs of species suspected to be similar, but different. Relatively recently, studies have been conducted to differentiate similar Trichuris species based on mitochondrial DNA differences, a much more accurate method of distinction. However, currently a paucity of research devoted to encoding the DNA of each and every species exists. As a result, Trichuris species distinction is still largely based on morphological differences.

Lifecycle
Currently, the general lifecycle of the whipworm is not completely understood. However, all whipworm species have a similar general lifecycle. Whipworm eggs are first ingested by the host. They eventually reach the duodenum of the small intestine, where the eggs ultimately hatch. The larvae from these eggs travel into the large intestine’s cecum. For about four weeks, the whipworms feed on blood vessels located within the cecum. Eventually, the whipworms leave the cecum and begin to lay thousands of eggs. These unembryonated eggs are then released from the host through feces. The process from egg ingestion to release takes around 12 weeks.  The released eggs become embryonated in approximately nine to twenty-one days and are eventually ingested by another host.

Whipworm eggs have thick, lemon-shaped, light yellow shells. Located on opposite ends of the shells are plugs that protect the eggs in unfavorable conditions such as rugged soil and the acidic environment of the small intestine. The actual egg is covered by a vitelline membrane.
When the eggs first exit the uterus of their mother, they are composed solely of yolk granules. Over a period of 72 hours, the eggs undergo mitotic division into two blastomeres that are separated by a transverse cleavage. Two additional cleavages occur within at least 96 hours, so that the eggs are now composed of four cells each. Cellular division continues in this manner and the morula stage is reached within the next week. After a total of 21–22 days, the larvae become fully developed and will not hatch until ingested by a host. The larvae can live for a total of six months without the assistance of a host. The timeline of egg development can vary depending on the species.

In domestic animals
Whipworms develop when a dog swallows whipworm eggs, passed from an infected dog. Clinical signs may include diarrhea, anemia, and dehydration. The dog whipworm (T. vulpis) is commonly found in the U.S. It is hard to detect at times, because the numbers of eggs shed are low, and they are shed in waves. Centrifugation is the preferred method. Several preventives are available by prescription from a veterinarian to prevent dogs from getting whipworm.

The cat whipworm is a rare parasite. In Europe, it is mostly represented by T. campanula, and in North America it is more often T. serrata. Whipworm eggs found in cats in North America must be differentiated from lungworms, and from mouse whipworm eggs that are just passing through.

T. campanula can be found in cats throughout the United States, having a whip-like shape, living in the large intestine and cecum of cats.  The cat gets infected with T. campanula by ingesting food or water that is contaminated with the whipworm eggs.  Once the cat ingests the infected eggs, they hatch and the larvae mature as adults in the large intestine, where they feed on the blood from the intestinal wall.  T. campanula lays eggs that are passed in the feces of the infected cat, remaining alive in soil for years.  The infection can be found by examining the feces of the infected cat.  Also, blood can be found in the feces that can help in diagnosing of the infected cat.  For prevention, cats should visit the veterinarian to get worming, having the feces inspected.

References 

Parasitic nematodes of mammals
Enoplea genera
Trichocephalida